Churchill Area High School was a secondary school that taught students in grades 10-12 for the Churchill Area School District located in Churchill, Pennsylvania, a close suburb of Pittsburgh. In 1987, the school (a.k.a. "CAHS") was merged with surrounding schools into Woodland Hills High School, at its present site due to a 1981 court-ordered desegregation merger.

Academic achievement

Sports
Churchill High School Hockey was a dynasty in the early days of the Western Pennsylvania Interscholastic Hockey League. The Chargers won the WPIHL League Championship in 1973,1974,1975,1976,1978,1979,1980,1982,and 1983. Churchill was a Pennsylvania AAA State Finalist in 1975 and 1976 and a Pennsylvania AAA Champion in 1977 (Philadelphia) over Erie McDowell 6-5 and in 1979 over Erie McDowell 10-9 [Two Game Series].

Performing arts

Notable alumni

 John Clayton, 1972, ESPN NFL analyst,  "The Professor"

 [(Mike Trcic (Special Effects Artist, Day of the Dead 1985, Glory 1987, Terminator 2 1989, Jurassic Park 1993)

References

External links
District website

Public high schools in Pennsylvania
Education in Pittsburgh area
Schools in Allegheny County, Pennsylvania
Educational institutions established in 1963
1963 establishments in Pennsylvania